The Ministry of Wildlife and Forest Resources Conservation is a ministry in the Government of Sri Lanka responsible "to pave the way for human beings and all animal species to live in harmony through the establishment of an effective Wildlife Reservation Network". It was created on 6 February 2013.

List of ministers

The Minister of Wildlife and Forest Resources Conservation is an appointment in the Cabinet of Sri Lanka.

Parties

See also
 List of ministries of Sri Lanka

References

External links
 Ministry of Wildlife and Forest Resources Conservation
 Government of Sri Lanka

 
Wildlife and Forest Resources Conservation
Wildlife and Forest Resources Conservation